Metarctia lateritia is a moth of the subfamily Arctiinae. It was described by Gottlieb August Wilhelm Herrich-Schäffer in 1855. It is found in Angola, Botswana, Burundi, Cameroon, the Democratic Republic of the Congo, Eritrea, Eswatini, Ethiopia, Kenya, Lesotho, Malawi, Rwanda, South Africa, Tanzania, Uganda, Zambia and Zimbabwe.

References

 

Metarctia
Moths described in 1855